The 2015 Slovak Open was a professional tennis tournament played on indoor hard courts. It was the 16th edition of the tournament which was part of the 2015 ATP Challenger Tour. It was also the 7th edition of the tournament which was part of the ITF Women's Circuit. It took place in Bratislava, Slovakia between 9 and 15 November 2015.

Singles main-draw entrants

Seeds

 1 Rankings are as of November 2, 2015.

Other entrants
The following players received wildcards into the singles main draw:
  Martin Blaško
  Altuğ Çelikbilek
  Alex Molčan
  Radek Štěpánek

The following players received entry to the main draw due to a protected ranking:
  Ante Pavić 
  Amir Weintraub
 
The following players received entry from the qualifying draw:
  Egor Gerasimov 
  Danylo Kalenichenko 
  Alexey Vatutin 
  Mikael Ymer

Champions

Men's singles

 Egor Gerasimov def.  Lukáš Lacko 7–6(7–1), 7–6(7–5)

Men's doubles

 Ilija Bozoljac /  Igor Zelenay def.  Ken Skupski /  Neal Skupski 7–6(7–3), 4–6, [10–5]

Women's singles
 Jesika Malečková def.  Anhelina Kalinina 4–6, 7–6(7–3), 6–4

Women's doubles
 Dalila Jakupović /  Anne Schäfer def.  Michaela Hončová /  Chantal Škamlová 6–7(5–7), 6–2, [10–8]

External links
Official Website

Slovak Open
Slovak Open
Slovak Open
Hard court tennis tournaments
Tennis tournaments in Slovakia
Slovak Open
Slovak Open